Edison is a commuter railroad station in the Stelton section of Edison Township, Middlesex County, New Jersey, United States. Located at the intersection of Plainfield Avenue (County Route 529) and Central Avenue, the station is served by New Jersey Transit's Northeast Corridor Line. Amtrak trains cross through but bypass the station. Edison station contains two side platforms, both high-level for handicap accessibility under the Americans with Disabilities Act of 1990 (ADA). The next station north, towards New York Penn Station is Metuchen while the next station south, with service towards Jersey Avenue station in New Brunswick and Trenton Transit Center is New Brunswick.

The station was originally constructed  at Central Avenue and Plainfield Avenue and named Stelton after the Stelle family, early settlers in Piscatawaytown who arrived in the area in the 1660s. The Pennsylvania Railroad renamed the station to Edison on October 29, 1956, as part of the changing of names in Edison to reflect the newly honored Thomas Alva Edison. The railroad discontinued its ticket and freight agent at Edison in October 1958. The railroad razed the brick station depot at Edison in October 1963. The station depot had burned and was in poor shape prior to its demolition.

In early 2005 plans were announced to expand the station, notably with the addition of 800 parking spaces. A new parking lot with 477 spaces opened on January 1, 2010.

History

Station rename (1954–1956) 
Suburban development leading to growth in the renamed Edison Township led to a drive to improve facilities for both the post office and Stelton station. Locals wanted a new central post office while Mayor James C. Forgione focused on the railroad station. Forgione stated that he wanted the Pennsylvania Railroad to improve service at the station, because the parking lots at the station reduced the pressure on stations at New Brunswick and Metuchen.

The township had room for increased suburban growth and felt that the railroad station would be the impetus for the development. By 1955, population had reached 30,000 and predictions showed 60,000 by 1975. Previous plans dating back to 1930 were to have a plaza built around station, but fell apart when a local landowner felt the township was lowballing an offer for their property and the Great Depression eliminated any other further progress. Forgione felt that a new station was necessary for some of the new developments popping up nearby. The idea of a new parking lot for parking for 400 cars and a pedestrian bridge crossing the tracks would attract commuters from Highland Park and Piscataway as well. The township also pressured the Pennsylvania Railroad to start considering park and ride stations as the older stations struggle to provide parking.

As part of this, Forgione wanted the station to be renamed Edison. At a meeting held on January 7, 1955, Forgione held a meeting at the Pines Manor to get both a post office and railroad station named Edison. The Edison Forum Club joined the drive that night, noting that they could get a new post office by renaming the Stelton post office Edison rather than building a new central one. They also signed on supporting the rename of the station. The post office changed names to Edison on August 1, 1955.

By November 1955, the Women of Edison, who was the organization that ran the campaign to change the name from Raritan Township to Edison Township, endorsed the idea of a station name change. Charles and Johanna Wira, who ran the organization, worked with new Mayor Thomas J. Swales to open communication with the railroad.

On April 23, 1956, the Forum Club, Women for Edison and township officials were notified by the railroad officials that the station name would be changed on September 30, pending approval of state government officials. The railroad noted that the agreement of the name change was done in sympathy of the local groups' demands. The approval of the New Jersey Public Utilities Commission came in May. The railroad told Swales and Wira that the change would be concurrent with the change of timetables for the winter 1956–1957 season. 

Officials announced on October 27 that they would be holding ceremonies for the station rename on October 29. Swales, members of the civic organizations and members of the Township Planning Board and Zoning Commissions would be in attendance. As part of the station rename, the railroad switch tower in Metuchen, named "Edison Tower" was renamed "Lincoln". The station rename ceremony occurred on October 29, with Swales posting the new station sign himself in front of Johanna Wira and Park Roeper, the official with the railroad who the township worked with.

Station layout
The station has two high-level side platforms. Most of Amtrak's Northeast Corridor services bypass the station via the inner tracks. Behind the Trenton bound platforms lies one freight track which merges with the Northeast Corridor just southwest of the station. The freight track eventually leads to several warehouses south of Brunswick Avenue.

References

External links

 Plainfield Avenue entrance from Google Maps Street View
 Station House from Google Maps Street View

NJ Transit Rail Operations stations
Stations on the Northeast Corridor
Railway stations in Middlesex County, New Jersey
Edison, New Jersey
Former Pennsylvania Railroad stations